Saskatoon Lake is a lake in Alberta.

Saskatoon Island Provincial Park is located on a former island of the lake, which now connects the western and eastern shores following a drop in the lake's water level.

The lake is designated as a federal migratory bird sanctuary.

See also
Lakes of Alberta

County of Grande Prairie No. 1
Saskatoon Lake